Iris Morhammer (born 28 April 1973 in Vienna) is a former Austrian international handballer who played as a right wing.

Morhammer was member of the Austrian national team that won the bronze medal both on the 1996 European Championship and the 1999 World Championship. She also participated on the Olympic Games in 1992 and in 2000, achieving two fifth places. She was capped 237 times and scored 663 goals.

References

1973 births
Living people
Handball players from Vienna
Austrian female handball players
Handball players at the 1992 Summer Olympics
Handball players at the 2000 Summer Olympics
Olympic handball players of Austria